Sigmar Bieber (born 4 January 1968) is a retired German football midfielder.

References

1968 births
Living people
German footballers
FC Schalke 04 players
Wuppertaler SV players
FC Gütersloh 2000 players
Rot-Weiß Oberhausen players
Rot-Weiss Essen players
SC Westfalia Herne players
2. Bundesliga players
Association football midfielders
Sportspeople from Gelsenkirchen
Footballers from North Rhine-Westphalia